Escobedo  is one of the 38 municipalities of Coahuila, in north-eastern Mexico. The municipal seat lies at Escobedo. The municipality covers an area of 973.9 km².

As of 2005, the municipality had a total population of 2,778.

References

Municipalities of Coahuila